is the fourth major label album release of the Japanese rock band The Back Horn.  The album was released on March 16, 2005.

Track listing

Tobira (扉) – 4:50
Unmei Fukuzatsukossetsu (運命複雑骨折) – 4:12
Cobalt Blue (コバルトブルー) – 4:26
Ninth major single.
Boseki Fever (墓石フィーバー) – 4:06
Yume no Hana (夢の花) – 4:36
Eighth major single.
Tabibito (旅人) – 4:48
Pappara (パッパラ) – 3:45
Shanghai Rhapsody (上海狂騒曲) – 3:44
Headphone Children (ヘッドフォンチルドレン) – 5:57
KIZUNA Song (キズナソング) – 6:00
Tenth major single.
Kiseki (奇跡) – 5:26
Theme song to the Japanese horror movie Zoo.

The Back Horn albums
2005 albums
Victor Entertainment albums